Alex William Pombo Silva (born 21 July 1988) is a lightweight judoka from Brazil. He won two gold and one silver medal at the Pan American Championships in 2014–16, but was eliminated in a second bout at the 2016 Olympics.

Biography 
Alex Pombo is a judoka of Minas Tênis Clube and the Brazilian national judo team. The athlete was born in Guaratinguetá. He began his career at age 12, in São José dos Campos, in the state of São Paulo, and is part of the national team in its category since 17 years.

The judoka demonstrated several times its fierce, determined and victorious posture. Alex was born prematurely with only 850g and 26 cm and had to fight for life in its early days. Career on the mats during the dispute of the World Military edition, the judoka competed with a trauma in the fifth lumbar budget. Not enough to overcome the pain, the athlete cut eyebrow during the dispute of the bronze medal. Referees wanted to end the fighting, but determined to get on the podium, Alex did not accept and asked that the dispute continued. In the end, he won the victory, the medal, and left the gym straight to the hospital where he had surgery.

Occupying a position among the world's best in its category, judoka has a successful career with several medals from major competitions on the world circuit. The athlete is the current champion of Judo Pan American Championship and Brazilian champion in its category. Also, it is often on the podiums of the tournaments in the world circuit mode.

References

External links

 
 

1988 births
Living people
Olympic judoka of Brazil
Judoka at the 2016 Summer Olympics
Brazilian male judoka
Judoka at the 2015 Pan American Games
Pan American Games competitors for Brazil
21st-century Brazilian people
20th-century Brazilian people